Crank may refer to:

Mechanisms
 Crank (mechanism), in mechanical engineering, a bent portion of an axle or shaft, or an arm keyed at right angles to the end of a shaft, by which motion is imparted to or received from it
 Crankset, the component of a bicycle drivetrain that converts the reciprocating motion of the rider's legs into rotational motion
 Crankshaft, the part of a piston engine which translates reciprocating linear piston motion into rotation
 Crank machine, a machine used to deliver hard labour in early Victorian prisons in the United Kingdom

Places
 Crank, Merseyside, a village near Rainford, England
 Crank Halt railway station in the village of Crank
 Cranks, Kentucky, United States

Popular culture
 Crank (film), a 2006 film starring Jason Statham
 Crank: High Voltage, the 2009 sequel
 Crank (Hoodoo Gurus album), 1994
 Crank (novel), a 2004 book written by Ellen Hopkins
 "Crank" (song), a 1993 song by the alternative rock band Catherine Wheel
 Crank (The Almighty album), the fourth studio album released by Scottish heavy metal band The Almighty
 Crank! A Record Company, a record label that released albums by indie bands Mineral, The Gloria Record, and Bright Eyes

Slang
 Crank (person), a pejorative term used for a person who holds an unshakable belief that most of his or her contemporaries consider to be false.
 Prank call or crank call, a false telephone call
 Crank, slang term for powdered substituted amphetamines, especially methamphetamine

Other uses 
 Cranks (restaurant), a chain of English wholefood vegetarian restaurants
 Crank (surname), a surname, notable people with the surname see there
 Crank conjecture, a term coined by Freeman Dyson to explain congruence patterns in integer partitions
 Crank of a partition, of a partition of an integer is a certain integer associated with the partition

See also
 
 
 Cranky (disambiguation)
 Krank (disambiguation)